One Love Manchester was a benefit concert and British television special on 4 June 2017, organised by American singer Ariana Grande, Simon Moran, Melvin Benn and Scooter Braun in response to the Manchester Arena bombing after Grande's concert two weeks earlier. It took place at Old Trafford Cricket Ground, and was attended by 55,000 people. Guest stars included Justin Bieber, the Black Eyed Peas, Coldplay, Miley Cyrus, Mac Miller, Marcus Mumford, Niall Horan, Little Mix, Katy Perry, Take That, Imogen Heap, Pharrell Williams, Robbie Williams and Liam Gallagher.

Proceeds from the event went to the We Love Manchester Emergency Fund established by Manchester City Council and the British Red Cross to help the victims and their families. The British Red Cross received more than £10 million in donations in the 12 hours following the concert. Networks from at least 50 countries broadcast the concert live, which was simultaneously streamed live on various platforms, including Twitter, Facebook, and YouTube.

New Yorks Vulture.com ranked the event as the No. 1 concert of 2017.

Background

On 22 May 2017, a suicide bomb attack was carried out at Manchester Arena in Manchester, England, following a performance by an American songstress Ariana Grande as part of the singer's Dangerous Woman Tour. 22 of the concert-goers and parents who were in the entrance waiting to pick up their children following the show were killed, more than 800 were injured and 116 of those were seriously injured.

Within a few hours after the bombing, Grande herself posted on Twitter: "broken. from the bottom of my heart, i am so so sorry. i don't have words." The tweet briefly became the most-liked tweet in history. Grande subsequently suspended her tour and flew to her mother's home in Boca Raton, Florida. On 26 May, she announced that she would host a benefit concert in Manchester for the victims of the attack.

Before main event

Developments and planning

Event tickets were made available on 1 June 2017 for £40, and sold with no booking fees. These tickets sold out within 6 minutes of going on sale. Fans who were at the concert of 22 May could apply to attend at no cost. The application ended on 31 May at 17:00, but was extended till 22:00 to allow as many people at the concert on the 22nd to apply to be there as possible. Metrolink offered free travel for concertgoers to and from the Old Trafford tram stop. Uber also said that fares of passengers travelling to and from the concert will be donated to charity.

Following the London Bridge attack that occurred the day before the show, Greater Manchester Police announced that security would be tighter than planned. They also advised attendees not to bring bags into the venue for security reasons.

Tickets for the concert were found to be listed for sale on the online auction site eBay, at prices above the original sales price. However, eBay responded by removing these listings from their site.

Main event
A minute's silence was held before Marcus Mumford opened the concert, at the request of Mumford, in memory of those killed both in Manchester and in London.

After Grande's first performance of the night, Stevie Wonder appeared via video link. After Heap's performance, a video of prominent Manchester footballer David Beckham reading a poem dedicated to the city was played. Videos of other artists and celebrities, including Halsey,  Bastille, Anne-Marie, Demi Lovato, Jennifer Hudson, Blossoms, Chance the Rapper, Camila Cabello, The Chainsmokers, DJ Khaled, Little Mix, Circa Waves, Kendall Jenner, Clean Bandit, Dua Lipa, Sean Paul, Nick Grimshaw, Kings of Leon, Sam Smith, Rita Ora, Shawn Mendes, Twenty One Pilots, Paul McCartney, U2 and the players of Manchester United and Manchester City declaring their solidarity with Manchester were also shown.

Liam Gallagher, former lead singer of local band Oasis, made a surprise appearance near the end of the concert. Previously, he had stated he wanted to perform but indicated a conflict with the Rock im Park festival in Germany. He flew in straight from his performance in Germany. Coincidentally, he was also scheduled to perform at the Rock am Ring festival two days prior, but the rest of that festival day was cancelled before his scheduled performance due to terror suspicions.

Usher was due to appear but did not perform due to parental duties. He appeared with other musicians in the pre-recorded video sending best wishes to Manchester.

Set list

Broadcast
The concert was broadcast live on BBC One, BBC Radio and Capital FM networks. Television coverage on BBC One was presented by Sara Cox and Ore Oduba, with Nick Grimshaw and Anita Rani hosting from backstage and within the crowd. BBC Radio coverage consisted of a simultaneous broadcast, hosted by Scott Mills, Jo Whiley, Phil Williams and Becky Want, on BBC Radio 1, BBC Radio 2, BBC Radio 5 Live and BBC Radio Manchester respectively. BBC World Service also transmitted the concert live. Outside broadcasting facilities were provided by Arena Television, and BBC Radio Outside Broadcasts.

The BBC announced that it would broadcast the entire concert even if it overran its intended three-hour duration, which it did by approximately 20 minutes.

UK radio stations
At least 65 British radio stations broadcast the event live, including 39 Global music stations: the entire Capital FM, Heart FM, Gold, Radio X and Smooth Radio networks.

International broadcasters
Broadcasters in at least 38 countries screened the concert live, despite the time zone differences. The BBC was the host broadcaster for international television networks, and the European Broadcasting Union (EBU) distributed the concert to its radio members, which was also streamed online. Radio broadcasters were provided the concert through the BBC World Service's programme distribution network. Stations that broadcast the concert were invited to make donations through the British Red Cross.

 Albania: RTSH 2 and Radio Tirana 2
 Argentina: TN (live), E!
 Australia: BBC UKTV (live) and Nine Network
 Austria: oe24.tv
 Belgium: Eén, La Trois, Pure FM and MNM
 Brazil: Multishow
 Bulgaria: Horizont and BNT 1
 Canada: CTV (live), Much (live), Virgin Radio and Vrak
 Chile: E!
 China: Tencent
 Colombia: E!
 Czech Republic: ČT art
 Denmark: TV 2
 Estonia: ETV and Raadio 2
 Finland: Yle TV2
 France: TMC, Mouv'
 Germany: 1LIVE, RBB Fernsehen, NDR 2, and DASDING
 Greece: ERT1
 Greenland: TV 2
 Hong Kong: ViuTVsix
 Iceland: RÚV and Rás 2
 Ireland: RTÉ2 and RTÉ 2fm
 Italy: Rai 1, Rai 4, Rai Radio 2, RTL 102.5, and Super!
 Latvia: Latvijas Radio 5
 Lithuania: LRT Radijas
 Mexico: E!
 Netherlands: NPO 3 and NPO 3FM
 New Zealand: TVNZ 1 and BBC UKTV
 Norway: NRK3
 Peru: E!
 Philippines: ANC
 Poland: RMF FM
 Portugal: RTP1
 Romania: TVR1, TVRi
 Sierra Leone: Capital Radio Sierra Leone
 Slovakia: Dvojka
 Slovenia: Radio Val 202
 Sweden: SVT24 and Sveriges Radio P3
 Switzerland: RTS Deux and Radio SRF 3
 Taiwan: KKBox
 United States: Freeform (live) and ABC (highlights)

Online streaming
The concert was streamed live online across a number of websites and apps, such as YouTube, Twitter and Facebook.

Attendance and ratings
The 50,000-capacity venue sold out within 20 minutes. Approximately 14,000 people who attended the original Ariana Grande concert were eligible for free tickets for the One Love Manchester concert. However, approximately 10,000 additional applications, from people ineligible for free tickets, caused delays in ticket processing.

The concert averaged 10.9 million viewers on BBC One, peaking at 14.5 million viewers. 22.6 million people watched at least three minutes of the programme on BBC One, making it the UK's most-watched television event of 2017. The concert reached an audience share of 49.3 percent in overall viewers, 69 percent of adults 16–24 and 61 percent in the demographic of 25–34 year-olds. Consolidated 7-day figures put the average UK viewership at 11.63 million. BBC iPlayer registered more than one million live-stream requests, making One Love Manchester the biggest non-sports programme in iPlayer’s history, surpassing the 2012 Summer Olympics opening ceremony.

Money raised
The British Red Cross received £2.35 million in donations during the three-hour concert for the We Love Manchester Emergency Fund. By the next day, the British Red Cross announced it had received more than £10 million since the attack, and subsequently, reports have set the total at more than £17 million.

Grande also donated all proceeds to the fund from a re-release of her single "One Last Time" and a live audio version of "Somewhere Over the Rainbow" that she performed during the concert.

Reactions
Francis Wilkinson, in Bloomberg.com, wrote that Grande offered "a face that was brave and kind in the wake of terror while accomplishing several useful goals – raising money for victims, bolstering courage and making the attacks look both puny and pointless. Whatever the terrorists had hoped to produce in Manchester, it certainly wasn't this party." She received praise for her "grace and strength" in organizing, hosting and performing at the concert. Madeline Roth of MTV News wrote that the performance "bolstered courage among an audience that desperately needed it. ... Returning to the stage was a true act of bravery and resilience". The City of Manchester named Grande as an honorary citizen of the city following the singer's "great many selfless acts and demonstrations of community spirit" and will be the first to be awarded from the city.

Kory Grow in Rolling Stone, wrote "It felt incredibly safe. As I made my own way to the tram, I wrote in my Apple Notes app, 'Helicopter hovering overhead,' which to me signified that the fans were being watched over. Then two policemen stopped me and asked me who I was with and whether I'd written anything about a helicopter into my phone, without explaining the technology of how they'd read my Notes app. After a friendly back-and-forth, they looked through my bag, checked my ID and business card and determined I wasn't a threat. 'You have to understand, tensions are running high,' one of the men said with a smile and a handshake, allowing me through the gate. Manchester was secure tonight." Dee Lockett, in New Yorks Vulture section, ranked the event as the No. 1 concert of 2017, noting:

In an interview with Billboard magazine, Grande's manager Scooter Braun remarked that "the City of Manchester was the Hero."

Accolades 
One Love Manchester received two nominations for the BAFTA Television Awards and a nomination for the BAFTA Television Craft Awards.

Awards and nominations

See also
 2017 in British television
 A Concert for Charlottesville

References

External links
 
 

2017 in British television
2017 in England
2017 in music
2017 television specials
2010s in Manchester
Ariana Grande
Benefit concerts in the United Kingdom
June 2017 events in the United Kingdom
Music in Manchester
BBC Television shows
BBC Radio programmes
British television specials
Music television specials
Simulcasts
Television shows directed by Hamish Hamilton (director)
Television series by BBC Studios